Moomin (むーみん) (born July 13, 1972) and styled as MOOMIN is a Japanese reggae artist. Along with a number of colleagues, he is responsible for the growth and popularity of Japan's reggae scene.

He is originally from Chigasaki, Kanagawa, and is married with two children. He works at Overheat Studios, and keeps his real name secret.

Moomin first appeared on the reggae scene in 1992, and traveled to Jamaica the following year. His official debut with a record label was in 1997 (under Ki/oon Records), and since 2003 he has been with Universal Music Group.

Discography

Singles
 Happy and Free (July 21, 1997)
 In the Rain (January 21, 1998)
 Feel Alright! (May 30, 1998)
 Kakegae no nai Mono (かけがえのないもの, Something with no Backup Copy) (January 21, 1999)
 Ride On (June 9, 1999)
 Big City (October 21, 1999)
 My Sweetest (November 20, 1999)
 Kimi wo Omou Yoru (キミを想う夜, The Night I Think of You) (November 15, 2000)
 Kanashimi ga Kieru made (悲しみが消えるまで, Until the Sadness is Extinguished) (February 28, 2001)
 @ the Dancehall featuring Corn Head (May 9, 2001)
 Summer Riddim 01 (August 8, 2001) (Moomin & Dōzan Miki)
 Straight Ahead (December 5, 2001)
 Kindan no Mori (禁断の森, Forbidden Forest) featuring Corn Head & Rude Boy Face (May 22, 2002)
 Natsu no Owari no Harmony (夏の終わりのハーモニー, Harmony of Summer's End) (July 24, 2002) Cover of Yōsui Inoue & Kōji Tamaki
 Itsumo Soba de (いつもそばで, Always There) (May 21, 2003)
 Saibai shitai ~ Sekai chū de~ (栽培したい～世界中で～, I Want to Help Things Grow Throughout the World) (August 6, 2003)
 Nebagiba (ネバギバ) (April 28, 2004)
 Joy of Life (March 30, 2005)
 Natsu Kirakira (夏キラキラ, Shining Summer) (May 25, 2005)
 Riverside Hotel (リバーサイド ホテル) (May 10, 2006) Cover of Yōsui Inoue

Albums
 In My Life (July 1, 1998)
 Moments (July 28, 1999)
 Triple M (November 15, 2000) Remix Album
 Get Here (May 23, 2001)
 Natural High (July 24, 2002)
 Rise Again (June 25, 2003)
 The Best of Moomin (July 2, 2003)
 Rise Again Remixes (September 17, 2003)
 No More Trouble (June 23, 2004)
 Featuring Works (November 24, 2004)
 Link Up (June 22, 2005)
 Adapt (May 24, 2006) Cover Album

DVD
 Moomin Live Tour 2004 "No More Trouble" (November 24, 2004)

Other
 Shōnan no Kaze (湘南乃風)「Ōen Uta (応援歌) feat. Moomin」
 Dōzan Miki (三木道三)「Gekkō (月光) feat. Moomin」

Radio
 Mother Music Records (JFN系) - PUSHIMと木曜23時より放送(2005年９月で終了)

See also
 PUSHIM - 事務所が同じ
 Dozan Miki - タワーレコードもポスターのみでなく、歌でも共演。
 Yōsui Inoue, Kōji Tamaki - 「夏の終わりのハーモニー」をカヴァー
 Kreva (Kick the Can Crew)
 Yamaarashi

External links
 http://moominke.com/
 公式サイト(レーベル)
 公式サイト(事務所)

References
This article comes directly from that on Japanese Wikipedia.

Musicians from Kanagawa Prefecture
Japanese reggae musicians
1972 births
Living people
People from Chigasaki, Kanagawa
21st-century Japanese singers
21st-century Japanese male singers